William Clarke Mathes (August 9, 1897 – September 26, 1934) was an American football player for the Georgia Tech Golden Tornado of the Georgia Institute of Technology. He graduated with an M. E. Mathes was a member of Tech's first national championship team in 1917, which outscored opponents 491 to 17. Mathes enlisted in the United States Marines and joined the First World War soon after that season finished.

Early years
William was born on August 9, 1897 in Jonesboro, Georgia to Nathaniel Beecher Mathes and Cora Blanche Clarke.

Later years
Mathes died unexpectedly on September 26, 1934 at his home in Jonesboro.

References

External links

1897 births
1934 deaths
People from Jonesboro, Georgia
Sportspeople from the Atlanta metropolitan area
Players of American football from Georgia (U.S. state)
American football guards
Georgia Tech Yellow Jackets football players
United States Marine Corps personnel of World War I